Meendoran railway station served Meendoran in County Donegal, Ireland.

The station opened on 1 November 1929 on the Londonderry and Lough Swilly Railway line from Londonderry Graving Dock to Carndonagh.

It closed for passengers on 2 December 1935.

Routes

References

Disused railway stations in County Donegal
Railway stations opened in 1929
Railway stations closed in 1935
1929 establishments in Ireland
1935 disestablishments in Ireland
Railway stations in the Republic of Ireland opened in the 20th century